Pierre Buret (3 May 1923 – 31 March 2003) was a French sailor. He competed in the 5.5 Metre event at the 1960 Summer Olympics.

References

External links
 

1923 births
2003 deaths
French male sailors (sport)
Olympic sailors of France
Sailors at the 1960 Summer Olympics – 5.5 Metre
Sportspeople from Caen
20th-century French people